Walter Merlo (18 May 1965 – 8 August 1998) was an Italian long-distance runner who competed at one edition of the IAAF World Cross Country Championships at senior level (1989).

Biography
In 1987 his 7:47.61 on the 3000 metres indoor was the second best season performance at the world. This is still the fourth Italian best performance of all-time.

Tragically dead at age 33, in mountain, falling on a climb of Corno Stella.

Achievements

References

External links
 Walter Merlo profile at Association of Road Racing Statisticians

1965 births
1998 deaths
Italian male long-distance runners